Real Maya was a Honduran football club.

History
The club was founded on 7 April 1985. They played in first division many season with many different names, Real Maya being the most used. In the 2002/2003 season they took the place of Real Comayagua.

Real Patepluma
They were named Real Patepluma and moved to Santa Bárbara for their final two seasons in the top tier of Honduran football before being excluded from the league.

Achievements
Segunda División
Winners (2): 1991–92, 2000–01

Honduran Cup
Winners (1): 1993
Runners-up (1): 1994

CONCACAF Cup Winners Cup
3rd Place (1): 1994

League performance

 Relegated on 1998–99.
 As Real Patepluma on 2002–03 Clausura and 2003–04 Apertura.

References

Defunct football clubs in Honduras
Association football clubs established in 1985
1985 establishments in Honduras